Héctor Méndez Alarcón (born 11 September 1959) is a Mexican politician from the National Action Party. From 2000 to 2003 he served as Deputy of the LVIII Legislature of the Mexican Congress representing Hidalgo.

References

1959 births
Living people
Politicians from Hidalgo (state)
National Action Party (Mexico) politicians
21st-century Mexican politicians
20th-century Mexican politicians
Members of the Congress of Hidalgo
Deputies of the LVIII Legislature of Mexico
Members of the Chamber of Deputies (Mexico) for Hidalgo (state)